Bali Coulibaly (born 3 June 1995) is an Ivorian basketball player. He plays for the Ivory Coast national basketball team and the Toulouse Basket Club.

Club career
Coulibaly started his career at the JL Bourg-en-Bresse in 2014 in the french JEEP ElITE League. He moved to the Union La Rochelle in the french NM1 league, He averaged 10.67 points in his only season at the club. In the 2019-2020 season, he moved to Toulouse Basket Club.

National team career
Coulibaly represents the Ivory Coast national basketball team. He participated at 2019 FIBA Basketball World Cup where he averaged 4 points.

References

External links
 Eurobasket.com profile
 RealGM profile

Living people
1995 births
Ivorian expatriate basketball people in France
Ivorian men's basketball players
JL Bourg-en-Bresse players
Sportspeople from Abidjan
2019 FIBA Basketball World Cup players
CEP Lorient players